Politics of Botswana takes place in a framework of a parliamentary representative democratic republic, whereby the President of Botswana is both head of state and head of government, and of a  multi-party system. Executive power is exercised by the government. Legislative power is vested in both the government and the Parliament of Botswana. In part because the party system has been dominated by the Botswana Democratic Party (BDP), which has never lost power since the country gained independence from the United Kingdom in 1966, the Economist Intelligence Unit has rated Botswana as a "flawed democracy."

Botswana is formally a multiparty constitutional democracy. Each of the elections since independence in September 1966 has been freely and fairly contested and has been held on schedule. The country's small white minority and other minorities participate freely in the political process. There are two main rival parties and a number of smaller parties. General elections are held at least every five years. The Judiciary is independent of the executive and the legislature.

Background 
The location of present day Botswana was historically controlled by Bantu peoples, primarily the Tswana people. Many legal traditions practiced by the Tswana people, such as respect for traditional authority and protection of property rights, have played a role in the development of post-colonial Botswana politics. Centralised political structures developed prior to colonisation have also been retained. Politics of the Tswana people prior to statehood was often led by chiefs, who continue to have a role in Botswana politics. In the early-19th century, these chiefdoms developed into nation states. These nation states incorporated limited government and ethnic pluralism.

The United Kingdom began involvement in the region in the 1820s, and the region became part of the British Empire in 1885 as the Bechuanaland Protectorate. The Tswana people were made subjects of the Crown and placed under British law. Botswana became self-governing in 1965, and it became an independent republic in 1966. The United Kingdom continued to invest in the country financially and pay some of its expenses through 1971.

Government 

Botswana is a parliamentary republic governed by the Constitution of Botswana. Botswana is the longest uninterrupted democracy in Africa.

Legislative branch 

The legislature of Botswana is derived from the Westminster system of the United Kingdom, though it has several aspects that distinguish it from this system. Unlike in the United Kingdom, the leader of the legislature has no executive powers, and it is subject to the Constitution of Botswana. Its official function under the constitution is to "make laws for the peace, order and good government of Botswana".

The legislative body of Botswana is the National Assembly, consisting of 65 members. 57 of these members are directly elected by their constituents and six of these members are chosen by the National Assembly. The President of Botswana and the Speaker of the National Assembly are ex officio members. For a bill to become a law, it must be approved by the National Assembly and by the president.

The Ntlo ya Dikgosi is an advisory body established by the constitution. Its members include chiefs of the Tswana people, elected subchiefs, and members chosen by the Ntlo ya Dikgosi. Any bill that affects the constitution or traditional tribal laws must be referred to the Ntlo ya Dikgosi, where it reads the bill and passes a resolution stating its position on the bill. It has no legislative powers of its own.

The legislature is responsible for serving as a check on the power of the executive. It uses a question time procedure to obtain information. The legislature has little power to limit the actions of the executive branch, leading to concerns that it cannot serve as a sufficient check on executive power.

Executive branch 
The executive branch of Botswana is headed by the President of Botswana, who serves as both the head of state and head of government. The Vice-President of Botswana and the Cabinet of Botswana operate underneath the President of Botswana. The president is selected by members of parliament, and the cabinet is formed from parliament members then selected by the president. The executive branch is the strongest in Botswana politics, and the President of Botswana has wide latitude in exercising governmental power over all branches of the government.

Judicial branch 
The highest court of Botswana is the Court of Appeal, which is constituted under section 99 of these Constitution and consists of a President and such number of Justices of Appeal as may be prescribed by Parliament. There are currently eight judges of the Court of Appeal, who are all expatriates drawn from different parts of the Commonwealth. To date, no Motswana has ever been appointed to the Court of Appeal.

The High Court is a superior court of record with unlimited original jurisdiction to hear and determine any criminal and civil cases under any law. The High Court is constituted under section 95 of the Constitution, and consists of a Chief Justice and such number of other judges of the High Court as may be prescribed by Parliament. There are currently sixteen permanent judges of the High Court. Until 1992, the judges of the High Court were expatriate judges who were appointed on short-term contracts of two to three years. In 1992 the first citizen judges were appointed to the bench. There are three High Court divisions in Lobatse, Gaborone and Francistown.

There are also Magistrates' Courts in Botswana. These courts are subordinate to the High Court and hear a range of civil, criminal and family law matters. There are nineteen Magistrates' Courts in the country, with fifty magistrates of whom seventeen are expatriate.

Judges are appointed by the president and may be removed only for cause and after a hearing.

Political parties

Botswana is a dominant-party state, and the Botswana Democratic Party (BDP) has ruled with a majority since the country's independence. A multi-party system allows several opposition parties to stand for election and seek representation in the legislature. Despite never holding a majority, opposition parties in Botswana wield more power than those of most other African countries, as there are no legal barriers to restrict the creation or growth of an opposition party. Historically, the Botswana National Front has been the strongest opposition party, advocating left-wing politics.

The opposition in the Botswana legislature has historically been fragmented, with several parties competing with one another in addition to challenging the BDP. Factionalism is common in Botswana political parties. Several parties have split from the Botswana National Front, including the Botswana Congress Party that became another significant opposition party after its creation in 1998. Some attempts have been made to create alliances between opposition parties, though none have ever prevented the BDP from achieving a majority in the legislature. In 2019, the Botswana National Front, the Botswana Congress Party, the Botswana Movement for Democracy, and the Botswana People's Party joined together as the Umbrella for Democratic Change.

Elections 

Botswana has held regular elections since its independence at five year intervals, all of which have been won by the Botswana Democratic Party. Elections are overseen by the Independent Electoral Commission (IEC).  Elections in Botswana use first-past-the-post voting in which the winner is the candidate that receives a majority or plurality of votes. Botswana is rare among African countries in that its elections have never been associated with widespread political violence.

The independence of Botswana's elections have been the subject of scrutiny. While elections are free and opposition parties are unrestrained, the incumbent party has access to other advantages. Prior to the creation of the IEC, the ruling party controlled elections through the Office of the Supervisor of Elections. The creation of the IEC has mitigated this to some extent, though its power to regulate elections is questioned. Referendums on election reform were held in 1987 and 1997.

Human rights 

Freedom House considers Botswana to be free with a score of 72/100 in its 2022 Freedom in the World report. It scored high in political rights, though Freedom House expressed concerns regarding the representation of women and minorities and the lack of freedom of information laws. It also scored high in civil rights, though Freedom House expressed concerns regarding freedom of the press and the right to strike.

Policy issues

Economic policy 

Botswana is an upper middle income country with a mixed economy, and it has one of the strongest economies in Africa. The foundation of Botswana's economic policy was set by the first post-independence government in the 1960s, incorporating a self-sustaining budget system through a series of national development plans. The country's economic success is attributed to neoliberal policies of free markets and private property protections, significantly increasing the population's post-independence living standards. More recent development have emphasised welfare statehood through redistributive economic policy. The discovery of a large diamond supply in Botswana has incentivised the government to pursue a commodity economy from mining, supplemented with beef farming, manufacturing, and tourism.

Foreign policy 

The president is responsible for Botswana foreign policy, overseeing the Minister of Foreign Affairs. Botswana's political and economic success relative to other countries in Africa has led it to play a larger role in regional and global affairs. By the end of the 20th century, Botswana had begun sending financial and military support to neighbouring countries and international organisations. Botswana's landlocked territory and export-driven economy have incentivised Botswana to maintain strong diplomatic ties with other countries. In its first years, Botswana had no military. The Botswana Defence Force was eventually created in response to regional instability.

Social policy 
Welfare programs in Botswana are relatively limited and subject to means testing, and there is no national level social security.The government of Botswana allows for high spending to increase access to education and healthcare. As of 2014, the Ministry of Education and Skills Development had the largest budget of any government initiative. HIV/AIDS is the most serious healthcare issue in the country, and the HIV/AIDS epidemic in Botswana is one of the most severe outbreaks in the world. Botswana received less foreign aid when combating the epidemic in the 1990s, allowing it to spread.

Notable people
 

Diabi Jacob Mmualefe (born 1958), diplomat

References

External links
 Judgments of the Botswana Court of Appeal
 Judgments of the Botswana High Court
 Republic of Botswana - Government portal